The Revolutionary Committee of the Chinese Kuomintang (RCCK), also commonly known, especially when referenced historically, as the Left Kuomintang or Left Guomindang, is one of the eight legally recognized minor parties that exist under the direction of the Chinese Communist Party, in the People's Republic of China.

It was founded in January 1948, during the height of the Chinese Civil War, by members of the left-wing of the Kuomintang (KMT), especially those who were against Chiang Kai-shek's policies. The first chairman of the party was General Li Jishen, a senior Nationalist military commander who had many disputes with Chiang over the years, while Soong Ching-ling (the widow of Sun Yat-sen) was named Honorary Chairwoman. Other early leading members were Wang Kunlun, Cheng Qian, He Xiangning and Tao Zhiyue. The party claims to be the true heir of Sun Yat-sen's legacy and his Three Principles of the People. In December 2022, the party had around 158,000 members.

Among the officially sanctioned political parties of the People's Republic of China, the Revolutionary Committee is officially ranked second after the CCP, being the first-ranking minor party. Thus, the Revolutionary Committee is allotted the second highest number of seats in the People's Political Consultative Conference (30%). It also owns numerous assets, some formerly owned by the Kuomintang, throughout mainland China. The Revolutionary Committee operates a range of party-owned institutions, such as party schools.

History 
After the end of World War II, the relationship between the Chinese Kuomintang and the CCP, who had allied to fight the Japanese, became increasingly tense; ultimately, both sides restarted the civil war, which World War II had interrupted. In 1945 and 1946, members of the Kuomintang's left formed the Three Principles of the People Confederation of Comrades and the Kuomintang Democratic Promotion Association in Chongqing and Guangzhou, respectively.

In November 1947, the first joint representative meeting of the Kuomintang left was held in Hong Kong; on 1 January 1948, the meeting announced the official establishment of the "Chinese Kuomintang Revolutionary Committee", and nominated Soong Ching-ling, the widow of Sun Yat-sen, as the Honorary Chairwoman of the Revolutionary Committee (despite Soong Ching-ling never formally joining the commission).

Chairman Li Jishen, He Xiangning, and Feng Yuxiang were selected as the central leadership of the organization. In 1949, Li Jishen and other representatives of the RCCK were invited by the CCP to participate in Chinese People's Political Consultative Conference.

People's Republic of China 
After the founding of the People's Republic of China in October 1949, members of the Chinese Kuomintang Revolutionary Committee maintained positions in the municipal and central governments.

In November 1949, the second congress of the Chinese Kuomintang Revolutionary Committee was held in Beijing. At the second congress, the Chinese Kuomintang Revolutionary Committee, Chinese Nationalist Democratic Promotion Association, the Comrades of the Three Peoples Principles, and other members of the Kuomintang's left wing agreed to merge and form the Revolutionary Committee of the Chinese Kuomintang.

Soong Ching-ling served as Vice President of the People's Republic of China and Honorary President of the People's Republic of China. Li Jishen served as Vice Chairman of the Central People's Government and Vice Chairman of the Central Military Commission.

Today, the Revolutionary Committee of the Chinese Kuomintang focuses on improving relations with the Kuomintang on Taiwan, and its membership mainly consists of the descendants of Kuomintang revolutionaries. It recruits members with current ties to Taiwan who support Chinese unification.

Organization 

The highest body of the RCCK officially is the National Congress, which is held every five years. 14th National Congress, held in December 2022, was the most recently held Party Congress. The National Congress elects the Central Committee of the RCCK.

According to its constitution, the RCCK is officially committed to socialism with Chinese characteristics and upholding the leadership of the CCP.

Central Committee 
The Central Committee of the Revolutionary Committee of the Chinese Kuomintang is the highest body of the RCCK between National Congresses. It has six working departments:

 General Office
 Organization Department
 Propaganda Department
 Liaison Department
 Social Services Department
 Research Department.

The Central Committee additionally owns the newspapers Unity Daily and Unity. The Central Committee is headed by a chairperson, who is assisted by several vice chairpersons. The current leaders of the RCCK are:

RCCK Central Committee Chairman 

 Zheng Jianbang, also a vice chairman of the Standing Committee of the National People's Congress

RCCK Central Committee Vice Chairpersons 

 He Baoxiang (First-ranking)
 Liu Jiaqiang
 Li Huidong
 Tian Hongqi
 Wang Hong
 Feng Gong
 Wu Jing
 Ouyang Zehua
 Gu Zhenchun
 Chen Xingying

Historical leaders

Chairpersons of the Central Committee 
 Li Jishen, 1948–1959
 He Xiangning, 1960–1972
 Zhu Yunshan, 1979–1981
 Wang Kunlun, 1981–1985
 Qu Wu, 1987–1988
 Zhu Xuefan, 1988–1992
 Li Peiyao, 1992–1996
 He Luli, 1996–2007
 Zhou Tienong, 2007–2012
 Wan Exiang, 2012–2022
 Zheng Jianbang, 2022–present

Honorary Chairpersons of the Central Committee 
 Song Qingling, 1948–1949
 Qu Wu, 1988–1992
 Zhu Xuefan, 1992–1996
 Hou Jingru, 1992–1994
 Sun Yueqi, 1992–1995

Chairpersons of provincial committees 
 Han Youwen, Chairman of the Xinjiang Branch until 1998

Electoral history

National People's Congress elections

See also 

 Kuomintang
 Politics of China
 List of political parties in China

References

External links 
  

 
Organizations associated with the Chinese Communist Party
Political parties in China
Political parties established in 1948
Kuomintang
Chinese nationalist political parties
Socialist parties in China